Royal Consort Sun of the Yangcheon Heo clan (Hangul: 순비 양천 허씨, Hanja: 順妃 陽川 許氏; 1271 – 1335) was the sixth wife of King Chungseon of Goryeo. 

She was firstly married to Duke Pyeongyang, son of Duke Jean and had 3 sons and 4 daughters.

After her first husband's death, she married King Chungseon.

It was said that her relationship with the King's beloved wife, Lady Kim Suk-bi was not good since the two of them received the same gogo (고고, 姑姑), an official hat that was worn by the women of the Yuan imperial clan.

Since Lasy Heo was the mother-in-law of the Emperor, she even went to Yuan's Imperial Palace to inquire about her son-in-law.

During a banquet, Lady Heo and Lady Kim changed their attire five times to show off their luxurious clothes and appearance.

All of Lady Heo's children married into noble families and the Yuan Imperial Family.

Family
Father: Heo Gong, Duke Mungyeong (허공 문경공; 1233–1291)
Grandfather: Heo Su (허수)
Grandmother: Lady Jang, Princess Consort Sinjeong (신정군부인 장씨)
Great-grandfather: Jang Geuk-u (장극우, 張克友)
Mother:
Biological: Lady Choi (부인 최씨)
Grandfather: Choi Jing (최징)
Older brother: Heo Chung (허총)
Younger brother: Heo Bu (허부)
Sister-in-law: Lady No of the Gyoha No clan (부인 교하 노씨)
Younger sister: Lady Heo, Princess Consort Gongam (공암군부인 허씨)
Brother-in-law: Jo Yeon, Duke Chungsuk (조연 충숙공) (d. 1322)
Adoptive: Lady Yun, Princess Consort Yeongpyeong (영평군부인 윤씨)
Grandfather: Yun Geuk-min, Duke Munpyeong (윤극민 문평공)
Older sister: Grand Lady Heo of Yangcheon County (양천군대부인 허씨, 陽川郡大夫人 許氏) (1255 – 1324)
Brother-in-law: Kim Byeon, Duke Mun of Sin (문신공 김변, 文愼公 金賆) (1248 – 1301)
Older brother: Heo Jeong (허정, 許程)
Sister-in-law: Lady Gi of the Haengju Gi clan (부인 행주 기씨, 夫人 幸州 奇氏)
Older sister: Lady Heo (부인 허씨, 夫人 許氏) (1265–1332)
Brother-in-law: Kim Sun, Duke Mun of Yeong (문영공 김순, 文英公 金恂) (1258 – 1320)
Older brother: Heo Sung, Prince Yangcheon (양천군 허숭, 陽川君 許嵩; d. 1311)
Sister-in-law: Princess Consort Seowon of the Seowon Yeom clan (서원군부인 서원 염씨, 瑞原郡夫人 瑞原 廉氏)
Nephew: Heo Jong, Great Prince Jeongan (정안부원대군 허종, 定安府院大君 許琮) (1286 – 1345)
Niece-in-law: Princess Suchun (수춘옹주, 壽春翁主)
Older brother: Heo Gwan (허관, 許冠)
Sister-in-law: Lady Song of the Yeosan Song clan (부인 여산 송씨, 夫人 礪山 宋氏)
Husband(s):
First: Wang Hyeon, Duke Pyeongyang (왕현 평양공 (d. September 1300)
Father-in-law: Wang Suk, Duke Jean (왕숙 제안공)
Mother-in-law: Princess Gyeongan (경안궁주)
First son: Wang Suk, Grand Prince Sunjeong (왕숙 순정대군)
Second son: Monk Jagak (자각, 慈覺)
Third son: Wang Jeong, Prince Hoein (왕정 회인군)
First daughter: Princess Yeongbok (영복옹주)
Son-in-law: Kim Gi-eon, Prince Yangyang (김기언 양양군)
Second daughter: Princess Yeonhui (연희옹주)
Son-in-law: Gilgilban (길길반, 吉吉反)
Third daughter: Bayan Qutugh Khatun (백안홀독황후)
Son-in-law: Ayurbarwada Buyantu Khan (아유르바르와다 부얀투 카안)
Fourth daughter: Princess Gyeongnyeong (경녕옹주)
Son-in-law: No Chaek, Prince Gyeongyang (노책 경양군)
Second: Chungseon of Goryeo (고려 충선) (20 October 1275 – 23 June 1325) – No issue.
Father-n-law: Chungnyeol of Goryeo (고려 충렬) (3 April 1236 – 30 July 1308)
Mother-in-law: Queen Jangmok of the Mongol Borjigin clan (장목왕후 보르지긴씨) (28 June 1259 – 21 May 1297)

References

External links
Royal Consort Sun on EToday News .

1271 births
1335 deaths
Consorts of Chungseon of Goryeo
12th-century Korean women
13th-century Korean women